KGNO (1370 AM) is a radio station licensed to Dodge City, Kansas, United States, the station serves the Southwestern Kansas area.  The station is currently owned by Rocking M Media, LLC. The station airs talk radio programs such as Sean Hannity and Rush Limbaugh.

History
On April 7, 1933, The Federal Radio Commission authorized KGNO to increase its power from 100 W to 250 W and to change its frequency from 1210 kHz to 1340 kHz.

References

External links
Rocking M Radio

FCC History Cards for KGNO
 

GNO
Talk radio stations in the United States
Radio stations established in 1930